Werewolf in a Girls' Dormitory is a 1961 Italian horror film directed by Paolo Heusch.

Plot
Wolves have been roaming around a girls' reformatory. When the girls begin to get murdered, suspicion focuses on both the wolves and on a handsome, newly hired science teacher, who might be a werewolf.

Cast

Production
Werewolf in a Girls' Dormitory was shot in 1961 around Cinecittà Studios and Rome. In the film, director Paolo Heusch is credited under the name Richard Benson. One of the films screenwriters Ernesto Gastaldi explained that it was mandatory to give yourself an English name in Italian productions of the time because "that's the way the producers wanted it."

The German actor Curt Lowens plays the werewolf in the film. Lowens described the werewolf transformations as being shot in reverse starting with full make-up and shot in reverse with more elements of his transformations being removed, the whole process shot with dissolves taking over three hours. Lowens described shooting the film as a chaotic experience with actors all predominantly speaking different languages: French, English, Italian and German.

Release
Werewolf in a Girls' Dormitory was released in Italy on November 9, 1961 where it was distributed by Cineriz. The film grossed a total of 115 million Italian lira on its theatrical run. The film was shown in the United States on June 6, 1963 where it was distributed by MGM.

The American version of the film adds the rock song "The Ghoul in School" to the opening credits written by Marilyn Stewart and Frank Owens. The song had vocals by Adam Keefe and was released on a 45 RPM record distributed by Cub Records.

It was released on DVD in the United States by Retromedia and Alpha Video.

Reception
From contemporary reviews, The Globe and Mail stated that the film was "disfigured by bad dubbing and a silly attempt to establish the locale as the United States, it might have been a very respectable specimen of the horror school" A review in the Monthly Film Bulletin reviewed an 81-minute dubbed version  of the film titled I Married a Werewolf, describing it as a "grotesque horror film" where "a certain relish can be derived in the early stages from the unspeakably foolish dialogue; but there is really nothing else on any level which one can possibly recommend."

Danny Shipka, author of Perverse Titillation: The Exploitation Cinema of Italy, Spain and France 1960-1980 stated the film "won't convert any fans to the genre", due to a slow pace and poor dubbing in the English-language version.

See also
 List of horror films of 1961
 List of Italian films of 1961

Notes

References

External links
 
 
 Werewolf in a Girls' Dormitory at Variety Distribution
 

1961 horror films
1961 films
Italian horror films
1960s Italian-language films
Films shot in Rome
Werewolf films
Films directed by Paolo Heusch
Metro-Goldwyn-Mayer films
Films with screenplays by Ernesto Gastaldi
Films scored by Armando Trovajoli
1960s Italian films